David Price (13 August 1910 – 6 July 1942) was a South African first-class cricketer and South African Navy rating.

Born in Cape Town in August 1910, Price appeared in fourteen first-class matches for Western Province between 1934 and 1939. In batting, Price scored 204 runs, his top score being 28* and his batting average clocking in at 37.18. With his right-arm medium pace bowling, Price took 28 wickets with his best bowling being 5 for 124.

During the Second World War, Price served in the South African Navy as an able seaman, being assigned to the minesweeper . On 6 July 1942, while serving in Arctic convoy QP 13, the Niger collided with a British-laid mine and sank, killing Price and 118 other sailors aboard. His body was never recovered and he is commemorated on the Plymouth Naval Memorial.

References

1910 births
1942 deaths
Cricketers from Cape Town
South African cricketers
Western Province cricketers
South African Navy personnel
South African military personnel of World War II
South African military personnel killed in World War II
Deaths due to shipwreck at sea